Fifteen Hungarian Peasant Songs, Sz. 71, BB 79 is a collection of short folk melodies arranged for piano by Hungarian composer Béla Bartók. It was composed between 1914 and 1918. In 1933, Bartók adapted and orchestrated parts of the piece as Hungarian Peasant Songs, Sz. 100, BB 107, commonly known by its Hungarian name, .

 Structure 

The collection consists of fifteen movements, some of which are grouped together. A typical performance lasts 13–15 minutes. The movement list is as follows:Four Old Tunes

Old Dance Tunes

Some critics claim Bartók intended the work to be split into two parts: the first one would include the first six movements, and the second one would include the following nine movements. However, such division is not present in the original score.

Orchestral version 
In 1933, Bartók adapted and orchestrated movements 6-15 of the piano version of the piece as Hungarian Peasant Songs, Sz. 100, BB 107. While this version cuts the first five movements of the original and parts of the thirteenth, it also adds material, such as additional variations in movement 12. This version of the piece is commonly known by its Hungarian name, .

Instrumentation 
The work is scored for the following orchestra:

Woodwinds
2 Flutes (2nd doubling piccolo)
2 Oboes (2nd doubling English horn)
2 Clarinets (2nd doubling bass clarinet)
2 Bassoons

Brass
2 Horns
2 Trumpets
2 Trombones
1 Tuba

Percussion
Timpani (doubling bass drum)

Strings
Harp
String section

Notable recordings 

Notable recordings of Fifteen Hungarian Peasant Songs include:

References

External links 

1914 compositions
1918 compositions
Compositions by Béla Bartók
Compositions for solo piano
Compositions for orchestra